Coey is a surname. Notable people with this surname include:

 Edward Coey (1805–1887), entrepreneur and philanthropist from Larne, County Antrim
 James Coey (1841–1918), American Civil War soldier
 John Alan Coey (1951–1975), American soldier in Rhodesia
 Michael Coey (born 1945), Belfast-born experimental physicist
As a middle name there is also:
 Edward Coey Bigger (1861–1942), Irish politician and physician
 Henry Coey Kane (death 1917), Royal Navy officer

See also
 Coey-Mitchell Automobile Company, former American car manufacturer and driving school operator